Claydon Deanery is part of the Archdeaconry of Buckingham within the Diocese of Oxford, England. It includes four benefices, including two team benefices, which contain 20 parishes in rural north-west Buckinghamshire in England. The deanery also includes eight Church of England schools.

List of Parishes

The Claydons (Benefice) 
 The Claydons (Parish)
 St Mary, East Claydon
 All Saints, Middle Claydon
 St Michael, Steeple Claydon

Schorne Team
 Dunton
 St Martin
 Granborough
 St John the Baptist
 Hardwick
 St Mary the Virgin, Hardwick
 Weedon School Chapel
 Hoggeston
 Holy Cross
 North Marston
 Assumption of the Blessed Virgin Mary
 North Marston Church of England School
 Oving with Pitchcott
 All Saints, Oving
 Quainton
 Holy Cross & St Mary
 Quainton Church of England Combined School
 Waddesdon with Over Winchendon and Fleet Marston
 St Mary Magdalene, Over Winchendon
 St Michael & All Angels, Waddesdon
 St Mary, Westcott
 Waddesdon Church of England School
 Westcott Church of England School
 Whitchurch with Creslow
 St John the Evangelist

Swan Team
 Barton Hartshorn
 St James
 Chetwode
 St Mary & St Nicholas
 Edgcott
 St Michael & All Angels
 Grendon Underwood
 St Leonard
 Marsh Gibbon
 St Mary the Virgin
 Marsh Gibbon Church of England School
 Preston Bissett
 St John the Baptist
 Twyford
 Assumption of the Blessed Virgin Mary
 Twyford Church of England School

Winslow, Great Horwood and Addington
 Winslow
 St Laurence
 Winslow Church of England Combined School
 Great Horwood
 St James
 Great Horwood Church of England Combined School
 Addington
 St Mary

Diocese of Oxford
Churches in Buckinghamshire
Geography of Buckinghamshire